Maria Baltazzi is a Los Angeles-based television producer, known for her work on a variety of unscripted, action-adventure shows. Some of her credits are working as one of the original four producers on CBS's Emmy award-winning show, Survivor and executive producer on TLC's record-breaking Sarah Palin's Alaska, which debuted at 5 million viewers. The first episode of this eight-part series was the most watched program launch in the network's history.
 
Maria has done a variety of shows that have aired on CBS, History, TLC, Discovery, and A&E. In 2001, she received an Emmy for the first two seasons of Survivor. That same year, she was also Emmy nominated for Eco Challenge: Borneo.

After seven seasons, Maria left Survivor to begin developing shows and showrunning.  In 2009, in association with Mark Burnett, Maria developed and executive produced History Channel's critically acclaimed Expedition Africa: Stanley & Livingstone. Then, she went on to produce TLC's hit series, Sarah Palin's Alaska in 2010.

Maria's production banner is called "Sojourn" (www.sojourn-usa.com).

Early career
Maria began her television career shortly after graduating from San Diego State University, where she received a Bachelor of Science in Marketing with a minor in Broadcast Management. Later, she attended the Art Center College of Design in Pasadena, where she and a classmate were the first two women to graduate with an MFA in film. 
 
Her first job in television was at KCST-TV, an NBC affiliate, in San Diego. She worked in the Traffic Department, inputting commercials into the station's daily program log. After that, she spent almost five years planning media campaigns for KRON-TV, an NBC affiliate in San Francisco. Later, she moved on to Los Angeles and switched her career to production. She started out as a TV show researcher and worked her way to being a producer/director.

Personal life
Maria has been on all seven continents and to forty-eight countries. She's climbed Mount Kilimanjaro in November 2008 and trekked to Everest Base Camp in May 2009. She is a distance walker and completed the New York City Marathon in November 2009, the Los Angeles Marathon in March 2010 and the Athens Marathon in October 2010. Her most recent marathon was the Great Wall Marathon in China in May 2011. She does marathons as a fundraiser for Lance Armstrong's Livestrong Cancer Foundation.

Marathon Walking Times:

2009 New York:  6:45:57

2010 Los Angeles: 6:49:00

2010 Athens: 6:55:29

2011 China: 6:20:17

Awards and Accolades
2011 Movie Guide Awards Nominated: Faith and Freedom award for Television Program: "Sarah Palin's Alaska"  (Executive Producer)
2009 Emmy Awards Nominated: Best Cinematography for Non-Fiction program: "Expedition Africa": Stanley & Livingstone" (Executive Producer)
2005 Emmy Awards Nominated: Outstanding Reality-Competition program: Survivor: Vanuatu & Survivor: Palau (judged as one show) (Supervising Producer, Survivor: Vanuatu)
2004 P.G.A. Awards Nominated: Television Producer of the Year Award in Reality/Game/Informational Series: Survivor (Supervising Producer)
2004 30th Annual People's Choice Awards Winner: Favorite Reality Based Television Program: Survivor  (Supervising Producer)
2003 Emmy Awards 4 Nominations: Survivor: Thailand & Survivor: The Amazon (judged as one show) (Supervising Producer, Thailand)
2003 29th Annual People's Choice Awards Winner: Favorite Reality Based Television Program: Survivor: Thailand (Supervising Producer)
2003 TV Week's Annual Critics Poll Winner: Number 1 Reality Show & Number 7 Favorite Show: Survivor (Supervising Producer)
2002 Emmy Awards 4 Nominations: Survivor: Africa & Survivor: Marquesas (judged as one show) (Supervising Producer, Africa)
2002 28th Annual People's Choice Awards Winner: Favorite Reality Based Television Program: Survivor: The Australian Outback (Supervising Producer)
2001 Emmy Awards 6 Nominations, 2 Wins: Outstanding Non-Fiction Programming, Special Class Winner and Outstanding Sound Mixing for Non-Fiction Programming (single or multi-camera): Survivor: Borneo & Survivor: The Australian Outback (Supervising Producer)
2001 27th Annual People's Choice Awards Winner: Favorite Reality Based Television Program: Survivor (Supervising Producer)
2001 Family Television Awards given by the Family Friendly Programming Forum (3rd Annual) Winner: Reality/Alternative Programming: Survivor: The Australian Outback (Supervising Producer)
2001 Emmy Awards nominated: Eco-Challenge: Borneo (Producer)

Show Credits (2000-present)
2011 One Man Army; Discovery (Executive Producer)
2010 Sarah Palin's Alaska; TLC (Executive Producer/Development Executive)
2009 Expedition Africa: Stanley and Livingstone"; History (Executive Producer/Development Executive)
2009 Greg Behrendt's Wake-Up Call; ABC (Supervising Producer)
2005 Bound for Glory; ESPN (Supervising Producer)
2000 - 2005  Survivor; CBS (Supervising Producer)
2003 Boarding House: North Shore; WB (Producer)
2002 American Fighter Pilot; CBS (Producer)
2001 Eco-Challenge: Borneo"; USA (Producer)

References

The Academy of Television Arts and Sciences
20 Best Reality-TV Shows Ever EW.com

All Movie Guide NYtimes.com

External links
 
OFFICIAL site of Maria Baltazzi

Living people
American television producers
American women television producers
Year of birth missing (living people)
21st-century American women